Nawaf Al-Mutairi may refer to: 

 Nawaf Al-Mutairi (footballer, born 1982), Kuwaiti football player
 Nawaf Al-Mutairi (handballer) (born 1989), Saudi handball player